Tarzan Taborda (Albano Taborda Curto Esteves) (May 27, 1935 - September 9, 2005), was a Portuguese professional wrestler.  He is the most significant professional wrestling star ever to emerge from Portugal.

Career
Born in Aldeia do Bispo, Penamacor, Portugal, Esteves became a professional wrestler after coming second in the Mister Europe bodybuilding competition.  He wrestled over 4000 professional wrestling matches (without losing a single one in his native country) from the late 1950s until 1981, earning the nicknames Taborda Sputnik, Tarzan Curtys, White Angel (France), King Kong (Africa), Mr. Mexico, and Juan Perez, among others.

As achievements he was four times European Champion and five times World Champion.  
He also wrestled in the Middle East, in countries like Iraq, where he performed in Baghdad for Saddam Hussein.

Tarzan Taborda was also a ballet dancer in Le Lido, Paris, and a stuntman, where he worked with Brigitte Bardot, Alain Delon, John Wayne and Robert Mitchum on various movies.

In 1992 he published a book titled "Como prolongar a vida com força saúde e beleza ao alcance de todos com método de cultura física".

Until 1994, he was the World Wrestling Federation's color commentator for their television airings in Portugal.

On September 9, 2005 he died of a myocardial infarction at the age of 70.

References

External links
Site Wrestling Portugal with more information, but in Portuguese

1935 births
2005 deaths
Portuguese male professional wrestlers